Paul Billings is an American doctor, lecturer, researcher, professor, and consultant on genetic information.  His major research interests include the impact of genomic information and biotechnology on society, the integration of genomics and diagnostics in to health and medical care and individualized genomic medicine. Dr. Paul Billings is the author of more than 250 publications and books on genomic medicine, has spoken at numerous medical conferences, and appeared on talk shows such as The Oprah Show and 60 Minutes. He is currently the chief medical officer of Natera, chairman of Biological Dynamics, Inc. and Plumcare LLC, and CEO of Synergenz Bioscience, Inc.

Biography 
Board certified internist and clinical geneticist, Dr. Paul R. Billings is a chairman of Biological Dynamics, Inc. and Plumcare LLC, and CEO of Synergenz Bioscience, Inc. He has completed an Executive-in-Residence at the California Innovation Center of Johnson & Johnson and was the medical director of the IMPACT Cancer Care Program Thermo Fisher Scientific (TFS). Recently, Dr. Billings was the chief medical officer of Life Technologies Inc. (LIFE) and then the CMO (consulting) of the Genetic Sciences Division of TFS both unique positions aimed at improving patient care through expanding the use of medically relevant genomic technologies in clinical settings. Dr. Billings has extensive expertise and health care experience in the areas of genomics and molecular medicine. He has served on the Scientific Advisory Board of the Food and Drug Administration and the Genomic Medicine Advisory Committee at the Department of Veterans Affairs. He currently is a director of the Personalized Medicine Coalition and a member of the IOM Genomics Roundtable. Prior to the appointments at Lifetech and TFS, Dr. Billings was the director and chief scientific officer of the Genomic Medicine Institute at El Camino Hospital, the largest community hospital in the Silicon Valley. He was also a member of the United States Department of Health and Human Services Secretary's advisory committee on Genetics, Health and Society before it was disbanded. Dr. Billings has had a distinguished career as a physician and researcher. He has been a founder or chief executive officer of companies involved in genetic and diagnostic medicine including GeneSage Inc., Omicia Inc., CELLective Dx Corporation and was senior vice president for corporate development at Laboratory Corporation of America Holdings (NYSE; LH). He has held academic appointments at some of the most prestigious universities in the United States including Harvard University, U.C. San Francisco, Stanford University and U.C. Berkeley, and has served as a physician at a number of leading medical centers. He is the author of nearly 200 publications and books on experimental and clinical medicine. His work on genetic discrimination was instrumental in the creation and passage of the federal Genetic Information Non-Discrimination Act of 2008. Dr. Billings holds an M.D. from Harvard Medical School and a Ph.D. in immunology from Harvard University. Prior to their recent transactions, Dr. Billings was a director of Ancestry.com (NASDAQ: ACOM), the executive chairman of Signature Genomics Inc., and a founder of the Cordblood Registry, Inc. He is currently a board director of Trovagene Inc. and CollabRX Inc., both publicly traded personalized medicine companies in the United States. He also acts as the chief medical officer of Omicia, Inc. He serves on many other for profit and not for profit Boards including the Council for Responsible Genetics, the country's oldest independent biotechnology “watchdog” organization.

Background

Billings has a varied background.  His education began at the Webb School of California in the 1960s. He then continued his undergraduate education at UC Santa Cruz in 1970 and transferred to UC San Diego in 1972. While at UCSD, Billings worked with adviser Martin Kagnoff as a student fellow at the Salk Institute of Biological Sciences and spent the summer of 1973 as a student summer fellow at American Gastroenterology Association advised by Morton Grossman. He graduated summa cum laude from UC San Diego in 1974 with an Artium Baccalaureatus (AB) Degree in History. After his undergraduate degree, Billings went on to study medicine and immunology at Harvard University with a Medical Scientist Training Grant Fellowship from NIH and Harvard University. He won Harvard Medical School's James Tolbert Shipley Prize for best published research in 1979. Billings' MD adviser at Harvard was Baruj Benacerraf, who went on to win a Nobel Prize the following year. Billings graduated in 1979 with both a PhD in immunology and an M.D. degree. Billings went from medical school into his residency at University of Washington Affiliated Hospitals, which he finished in 1982. After his residency, Billings stayed on as a fellow in medical genetics until 1984 under the advisement of Dr. Arno Motulsky. After a winter as acting assistant professor in the Department of Genetics, still at University of Washington, he returned to the Boston area to begin a series of clinical and research fellowships. By 1985, Billings was diplomat and board certified by the American Board of Internal Medicine. Billings went on to teach and tutor at a university level while conducting research and practicing medicine. Billings has been on the faculties of University of California, Berkeley, Harvard University, University of California, San Francisco, and Stanford University. His research focuses on ethics and medicine. Specifically, he is interested in the impact of genetic information and biotechnology on society, the integration of genomics into healthcare, post-genomic health and identity, molecular biology and immunogenetics, their relationship to cellular differentiation, and their application in cancer care, and human stem cell research and its relationship to clinical medicine. Billings' research on genetic discrimination provided academic support for the Genetic Information Non-discrimination Act. He has received research grants for his work from various organizations, including National Institutes of Health, the Robert Wood Johnson Foundation, and the Council for Responsible Genetics.

Government positions

A partial list of Billings' government positions:

Former Board Member of Scientific Advisory Board of the Food and Drug Administration 
Former Board Member of Genomic Medicine Advisory Committee at the Department of Veterans Affairs

Office of Technology Assessment, United States Congress:
Contractor 1989 ("Genetic Testing in the Workplace")
Reviewer 1989 ("DNA Identification Systems"), 1990 ("Genetic Testing in the Workplace"), 1991 ("CF Screening"), 1994 ("DNA Patenting")

National Institutes of Health (NIH):
Special Study Section 1989 ("The Human Genome Initiative")
Member of Study Section on Cystic Fibrosis Screening for NIH Genome Center 1991
Member of the Special Insurance Task Force on Insurance and Genetics 1991-1993 (NIH/DOE)
Chair of NIH Special Task Force on Insurance and Genetic Information's Subcommittee on "Genetic Discrimination" 1991-1993
Consultant for NIH/Food and Drug Administration Recombinant DNA Advisory Committee 1999
Reviewer for NIH Special Study on Salivary Diagnostics for the National Institute of Dental and Craniofacial Research 2007–present

Videos

 Paul speaking at the PMWC 2016 Conference https://vimeo.com/156680740
 Paul speaking about regulatory issues at the PMWC 2016 Conference https://vimeo.com/60355499

See also
 Life Technologies

Publications

Partial list of publications:
Billings P.  Alert on Genetic Discrimination.  Medical Tribune 1990; 31(12):15.
Billings P.  Biotechnology: Ethical Dilemmas.  Biotech Monitor  1991; 1(2):2,4-6.
Billings P.  Rising Cost of Private Health Insurance.  U.S. Congress Committee on Energy and Commerce. US Government Printing Office 1991; 11-58.
Billings P and Beckwith J.  Genetic Testing in the Workplace.  Trends in Genetics 1992; 8(6):198-202.
Billings P.  Public Must Be Educated About the Limited Predictive Usefulness of Genetic Diagnoses.  Genetic Engineering News 1992; 12(19): 4, 38.
Billings P.  Promises and Pitfalls of Genetic Testing.  Bay Area BioScience Reports 1992;3(4): 5,7.
Billings P. Genetic Discrimination by Insurers: The Public Perception. J Insur Med 1993; 25(2): 184-91.
Billings P. Genetic Discrimination: What Can We Learn from History? (commentary) Blatt,  Miller and Haddow (eds). The Genetic Resource 1994;  8(1): 44.
Billings P.  A Study of Genetic Discrimination. (background paper and appendix). In: Genetic Information and Health Insurance:  Report of the Task Force on Genetic Information and Insurance. NIH Publication 93-3686 1993.
Billings P. and Hubbard R. Fragile X Testing: Who Benefits? GeneWatch 1994; 9(3-4):1-3.
Billings P.  Comments on the social, legal and policy issues arising from the genetic revolution.  Testimony before the Senate Select Committee on Genetics and Public Policy on April 8, 1996.  State of California Printing Office 1996.
Billings P.  Genetic information and privacy (a background paper).  For the Record: Protecting Electronic Health Information.  National Academy Press 1997.
Billings P.  Comments on genetic research and privacy issues.  In: Privacy Issues in Biomedical and Clinical Research.  National Academy Press 1998.
Billings P. "Wider impact? (letter)". HMS Beagle: The BioMedNet Magazine 1998; 42; Nov 13.
Billings P.  DNA data banks would taint justice.  Boston Globe 1999; Jan 14 (A):19.
Billings P.  "Iceland, blood and the role of science".  Am Sci 1999; 87(3):199-00.
Billings P.  Perspective on medicine: does life as a patient begin even before patient is born?  Los Angeles Times 1999; Mar 11 (B):9.
Billings P.  Modified foods are like drugs.  Boston Globe 1999; Aug 28 (A):19.
Nadar C, Herbert M, Billings P, Bereano P, Hubbard R, King J, Newman S, and Stabinsky D. Resdesigning Evolution? (letter). Science 1999; 285 (3):1491.
Spinard P. with Billings P.  ReadMe.  Wired 2001; 9(12): 98.
Billings P, Rothstein M, Faigman D and Jones R.  Cutting edges issues in law and science. Proceedings of a 9th circuit judicial conference panel presentation. In: Scientific Evidence Review Monograph 3 (Cwik C and North J, eds)  2001 ABA Publishing, Chicago, IL. pp1–52.
Beeson D, Billings P, Darnofsky M, and C Weiner.  Ethics, genetic technologies and social responsibility in the 21st century.  2001 Proceedings of a Townsend Center panel. .
Worthy K., Strohman R., Billings P.  Conflicts around a study of Mexican crops. Nature 2002; 417:897.
Billings P.  A medical geneticist's view.  World Watch 2002; 15(4):16.
Billings, P.  Your DNA computer: When machines and humans blend. IHealthBeat 2002: Sept. 6. .
Billings P.  Iron revisited.
P.R. Billings and M.P. Brown. The future of clinical laboratory genomics. M.L.O. Dec (2004). 8-15.
Billings P.  Stem cell research:  Dangerous territory?  New Scientist.  2006;2576.
Billings P.  Personalized management of cancer using circulating tumor cells.  The Personalized Medicine Report 2008; 11:18-21.

Billings on "Genetics news (www.geneletter.com)":
Homecooked eugenics.  GeneLetter 2000; 1(Feb; 1)
New heights of compatibility.  GeneLetter 2000; 1(Feb; 1)
Understanding the EEC split.  GeneLetter 2000; 1(Feb; 1)
Thinking in neurofibromatosis type 1. GeneLetter 2000; 1(Feb; 1)
Constructing a new genetics.  GeneLetter 2000; 1(Feb; 1)
Wherefore art thou disease genes?  GeneLetter 2000; 1(Mar; 2)
Genetic for all.  GeneLetter 2000; 1(Apr; 3)
Following up.  GeneLetter 2000; 1(May; 4)
A gene therapy death.  GeneLetter 2000; 1(Jun; 5)
Gene therapists beware: lessons from GM food.  GeneLetter 2000; 1(Jun; 5)
Mutation: the good, the bad and the ugly.  GeneLetter 2000; 1(Jul; 6)
Biotechnology's albatross.  GeneLetter 2000; 1(Aug; 7)
A genomic failure.  GeneLetter 2000; 1(Aug; 7)
Warp speed genetics.  GeneLetter 2000; 1(Sep; 8)
Questioning the question: the role of opposites.  GeneLetter 2000; 1(Sep; 8)
On crooks, adverse selection and insurance genetics.  GeneLetter 2000; 1(Oct; 9)
Art and genetics: asking the right questions.  GeneLetter 2000; 1(Oct; 9)
Practicing responsible genetic medicine.  GeneLetter 2000; 1(Nov; 10)
Genetic hygiene: public health anew?  GeneLetter 2000; 1(Dec; 11)
Applying genetic advances: where do we go from here.  A report from GeneSage's “Genetic issues survey of managed care executives”.  GeneLetter 2000; 1(Dec; 11)
Paying for the genetic revolution.  GeneLetter 2001; 1(Jan; 12)
Hemochromatosis imbroglio.  GeneLetter 2001; 1(Jan; 12)
Happy Birthday, GeneLetter.  GeneLetter 2001; 2(Feb; 1)
The disappearing gene.  GeneLetter 2001; 2(Mar; 2)
Where things stand.  GeneLetter 2001; 2(Apr; 3)
Human genetic complexity.  GeneLetter 2001; 2(May; 4)
Genetic screening anew.  GeneLetter 2001; 2(Aug; 5)

Books published:
Billings P (ed). DNA on Trial: Genetic Identification and Criminal Justice. Cold Spring Harbor Pubs, 1992.

See also
 Genetic privacy

References

External links
"Expert Consultants page on Billings"
"1990 interview with Billings"
"Genetic Privacy and Confidentiality, testimony by Billings"
"Nature article on Billings"
"American Scientist bio of Billings"
"Radio Interview with Billings on Smoking Prevention(audio)"

Harvard Medical School alumni
Living people
American geneticists
Year of birth missing (living people)